Norm Gillespie was an association football manager of the 1940s.

In 1947, he was coach of the Australian national team for three games, all against South Africa. The matches, which were part of a series of five, ended in two losses and a draw.

Managerial statistics

References

Australia national soccer team managers
Year of birth missing
Year of death missing
Australian soccer coaches